Kamphaus is a surname. Notable people with the surname include:

 Franz Kamphaus (born 1932), German Catholic priest, bishop emeritus of Limburg
 Mark Kamphaus, American football player

See also
 Campenhausen 

German-language surnames